Ibrahim ibn Baks (died in 1003 CE) was a physician and a regular lecturer in Al-'Adudi Hospital, a bimaristan located in Baghdad during the Islamic Golden Age. He became blind towards the end of his life.

According to Ibn Abi Usaibi'a, Ibn Baks translated many works into the Arabic-language.

Works
Among his works are a large and a small compendium of medicine and monographs on diseases of the skin, of the eyes, on anatomy and on antidotes. His works include:
 كناشه كتاب الأقراباذين
 مقالة في الجدري

References 

1003 deaths
Physicians from the Abbasid Caliphate
10th-century physicians
Translators of the medieval Islamic world
Blind academics
Year of birth unknown
10th-century people from the Abbasid Caliphate
Scholars under the Buyid dynasty